The 2006 Superstars Series season was the third season of the Campionato Italiano Superstars (Italian Superstars Championship).
The championship was won by Max Pigoli driving for Jaguar.

Teams and drivers

Calendar

External links
Official Superstars website

Superstars Series
Superstars Series seasons